The Pride of Jennico is a lost 1914 silent swashbuckler film directed by J. Searle Dawley. It was produced by Adolph Zukor and released on a State Rights basis. On the Broadway stage, the play starred James K. Hackett, Bertha Galland and Arthur Hoops.

Cast
House Peters - Basil Jennico
George Moss - Basil's Uncle
Marie Leonard - Princess Ottilie
Augustus Balfour - Duke of Dornheim
Emily Calloway - Marie, Ottilie's Maid
Peter Lang - Von Krappitz
Hal Clarendon - Prince Eugen
Betty Harte - The Gypsy Maid, Michel

References

External links
  The Pride of Jennico at IMDb.com
 
  Famous Players ad(archived)

1914 films
American silent feature films
Films directed by J. Searle Dawley
Lost American films
American films based on plays
Films based on British novels
Films based on adaptations
Films set in the 1770s
Films set in Germany
American black-and-white films
1910s American films